Funü zazhi (Chinese: 婦女雜誌; The Ladies’ journal) was a women's magazine which was in circulation between January 1915 and January 1931 in the Republican period of China and was the longest-running publication in its category during that period.

History and profile
Funü zazhi was started in Shanghai in January 1915. The magazine was published by the Commercial Press on a monthly basis. The company was one of the leading publishing houses in the country. The founding editor-in-chief of the magazine was Wang Yunzhang who was replaced by an American-educated female journalist Hu Binxia in 1916. Her tenure ended in 1919. 

Funü zazhi was distributed in twenty-eight cities of China and also, in Hong Kong, Macao, and Singapore. In the early period it sold 3,000 copies, but soon its circulation rose to 10,000 copies. The magazine folded in January 1931.

Content and audience
Funü zazhi supported women’s rights and their self-education, emphasizing the importance of literature, arts and crafts in this process. The other frequently topics covered in the magazine included women’s health and household economics.

In the period between its start in 1915 and 1919 Funü zazhi featured short stories and translated articles from Japanese women's magazines. These translated articles were about developments in medicine and Western technology. It also often published medicine advertisements. From November 1919 the content of the magazine was radically redesigned, and it began to offer articles on love, free marriage and divorce, female emancipation, women's education, and employment of women. From 1926 and 1931 the topics covered in Funü zazhi were again modified radically, and the magazine included articles which supported traditional values similar to its initial period. However, its focus on medicine continued during this period, and it had a column on medical advice where physicians answered the questions of readers.

The magazine was very popular among young people and was one of the most read popular magazines as voted by Chinese secondary school students.

Legacy
Issues of Funü zazhi were archived and digitized by Heidelberg University.

References

1915 establishments in China
1931 disestablishments in China
Chinese-language magazines
Defunct magazines published in China
Magazines established in 1915
Magazines disestablished in 1931
Monthly magazines published in China
Women's magazines published in China
Magazines published in Shanghai